Kim Young-ok (born December 5, 1937) is a South Korean actress who debuted in 1957. She is known as South Korea's "National Grandma" for her many portrayals of grandmothers in film and television.

Career 
In 1959, Kim joined the Chuncheon Broadcasting Station as an announcer through open recruitment. In 1960, She re-entered the CBS Christian Broadcasting Company as a voice actor for the 6th term. A year later, in 1961, she officially debuted as a voice actor for the 1st round of MBC Cultural Broadcasting, and in 1969 appeared in MBC TV drama for the first time.

Kim Young-ok is one of Korea's representative actors who have been active without a hiatus since her debut. Currently, she is the oldest active actress in Korea.

Filmography

Film

Television series

Web series

Television show

Voice acting

Awards and nominations

References

External links

 
 
 
 

1937 births
Living people
20th-century South Korean actresses
21st-century South Korean actresses
South Korean television actresses
South Korean film actresses
South Korean voice actresses
Gwangsan Kim clan
Best Actress Paeksang Arts Award (television) winners